Gianni Alessio Bui (born May 5, 1940 in Serramazzoni) is an Italian professional football coach and a former player, who played as a forward.

Career
Bui played 11 seasons (188 games, 53 goals) in the Italian Serie A for S.S. Lazio, SPAL 1907, Bologna F.C. 1909, Hellas Verona F.C., Torino Calcio and A.C. Milan.

Career statistics

Club

Honours

Player

Club
Torino
 Coppa Italia winner: 1970–71.

Individual
 Serie A 2nd best scorer: 1968–69 (15 goals) and 9th best scorer: 1971–72 (9 goals).
 Serie B top scorer: 1965–66 (18 goals) and 2nd best scorer: 1966–67 (15 goals).

Coach
 Promotion to Serie C1 with A.C. Pavia: 1986–87.
 Promotion to Serie C1 with A.C. Chievo Verona: 1988–89.

References

External links
Profile at Enciclopediadelcalcio.it

1940 births
Living people
Italian footballers
Serie A players
Serie B players
Serie C players
S.S. Lazio players
Pisa S.C. players
S.P.A.L. players
Bologna F.C. 1909 players
U.S. Catanzaro 1929 players
Hellas Verona F.C. players
Torino F.C. players
A.C. Milan players
S.S.D. Varese Calcio players
Italian football managers
Genoa C.F.C. managers
A.C. ChievoVerona managers
Casale F.B.C. managers
Venezia F.C. managers
Association football forwards